The Toyota R32V and R36V engine family are a series of turbocharged, 3.2-liter and 3.6-liter, 90-degree, four-stroke, V-8, gasoline racing engines, designed, developed and produced by Toyota for sports car racing; between 1988 and 1999. The engines were used in various Toyota sports prototype race cars.

Applications
Toyota 88C-V
Toyota 89C-V
Toyota 90C-V
Toyota 91C-V
Toyota 92C-V
Toyota 93C-V
Toyota 94C-V
Toyota GT-One

References

 
Toyota engines
Gasoline engines by model
Engines by model
Group C
V8 engines